Eugène Christian Chamborant (4 June 1892 – 10 December 1948), was a French film director.

Biography 
Little is known about the life of this discreet filmmaker who ended his days a week before the release of his latest film. Before becoming a director, he was the author of numerous documentaries during the 1920s–1930s.

Among other things, he worked for the productor Pierre Caron who made him take his first steps on the cinema sets from 1936.

Filmographie

Film editor 
 1936: , de Pierre Caron
 1936: Marinella, by Pierre Caron 
 1937: The Club of Aristocrats, by Pierre Colombier 
 1937: , by Pierre Colombier

Production manager 
 1938:  by Pierre Colombier
 1946: Son of France, by

Assistant director 
 1938: , by Jean Boyer
 1939: Cocoanut, by Jean Boyer
 1939: Circonstances atténuantes, by Jean Boyer
 1939: Nine Bachelors, by Sacha Guitry
 1939: Serenade, by Jean Boyer
 1940: Miquette, by Jean Boyer

Director 
 1937: , with Michel Bernheim
 1939: Latin Quarter, with Pierre Colombier and Alexander Esway
 1941: 
 1942: 
 1947: 
 1948:

Bibliography

External links 

Film directors from Paris
1892 births
1948 suicides
Suicides in France
1948 deaths